This article lists a number of common generic forms in place names in the British Isles, their meanings and some examples of their use. The study of place names is called toponymy; for a more detailed examination of this subject in relation to British and Irish place names, refer to Toponymy in the United Kingdom and Ireland.

Key to languages: Bry: Brythonic; C: Cumbric; K: Cornish; I: Irish; L: Latin; ME: Middle English; NF: Norman French; OE: Old English (Anglo-Saxon); ON: Old Norse; P: Pictish; S: Scots; SG: Scots Gaelic; W: Welsh

See also
 English Place-Name Society
 Germanic toponymy
 List of United Kingdom county name etymologies
 Place name origins
 Place names in Ireland
 Placenames Database of Ireland
 Scottish toponymy
 Toponymy in the United Kingdom and Ireland
 Toponymy of England
 Welsh toponymy

References

External links

English toponymy
Ireland geography-related lists
Irish toponymy
Lists of United Kingdom placename etymology
United Kingdom
Scottish toponymy
United Kingdom geography-related lists
Welsh toponymy
Prefixes
English suffixes